The Cuyo Archipelago or Cuyo Islands, is a group of about 45 islands lying to the northeast of the Philippine island of Palawan. It lies south of Mindoro and between Northern Palawan and Panay.

Cuyo is divided into two island groups. To the north is the Quiniluban group. To the south is the Cuyo group, where the centers of the three municipalities namely Cuyo, Agutaya, and Magsaysay are located.

Geologically, the islands are related to the main island of Palawan. They are positioned on the western edge of the Luzon Arc. Cuyo island is volcanic. The northern islands of Quiniluban seem to be uplifted coral atolls, although the heights of some of the peaks strongly suggest volcanic uplift. There have been plans before to establish the Cuyo Archipelago as a separate province from Palawan, just like what happened when Batanes became independent from Cagayan province. Many other islands of the group are purely corallian.

Cuyo is divided in three municipalities, namely Cuyo, Agutaya, and Magsaysay:

Cuyo, Palawan (southern and western part)
Magsaysay, Palawan (eastern part)
Agutaya, Palawan (northern part)

Altogether, 45,718 people inhabit the Cuyo group of islands.

Some of the main islands, or island groups, are:

Quiniluban
Pamalican
Manamoc

Agutaya
Cuyo

Islands

Notes

External links

 
Islands of Palawan
Archipelagoes of the Philippines
Archipelagoes of the Pacific Ocean
Archipelagoes of Southeast Asia
Maritime Southeast Asia